Batbayaryn Enkhkhüslen (born 14 December 2001) is a Mongolian swimmer. She competed in the women's 50 metre freestyle at the 2020 Summer Olympics.

References

External links
 

2001 births
Living people
Mongolian female swimmers
Mongolian female freestyle swimmers
Olympic swimmers of Mongolia
Swimmers at the 2020 Summer Olympics
Sportspeople from Ulaanbaatar
Asian Games competitors for Mongolia
Swimmers at the 2018 Asian Games
21st-century Mongolian women